, also called the Five Lakes of Mikata, are a series of brackish and freshwater lakes located in Mihama and Wakasa, Fukui, Japan, which are close to the coast of Wakasa Bay. They consist of Lakes Mikata (三方湖), Suigetsu (水月湖), Suga (菅湖), Kugushi (久々子湖) and Hiruga (日向湖). These five lakes are all located in Wakasa Wan Quasi-National Park. In 2005 the lakes were designated as a Ramsar site. The Lake Suigetsu is famous for its varves, which were adopted as a global standard for dating geological and historical relics in 2012.

Geography 
Mikata Five Lakes refers to Lakes Maikata, Suigetsu, Suga, Kugushi and Hiruga. Lakes Mikata, Suigetsu and Suga, which are located in the southern part, are connected with each other via natural straits. In addition, Urami Canal built in 1664 connects Lake Kugushi with Suigetsu, and Saga Tunnel built in 1934 connects Lake Hiruga with Suigetsu.

See also 
 List of lakes of Japan
 List of Ramsar sites in Japan
 Wakasa Wan Quasi-National Park
 Lake Suigetsu
 Torihama shell mound
 Wakasa Mikata Jomon Museum

References

External links 

 Mikata Five lakes - Japan National Tourism Organization
 Lake Suigetsu - www.suigetsu.org

Lakes of Japan
Ramsar sites in Japan
Landforms of Fukui Prefecture
Wetlands of Japan
Mihama, Fukui
Wakasa, Fukui